Echo Heron, born Echo Ruah Salato in Troy, New York is an author of fiction, non-fiction,  mysteries and historical fiction. She is also a critical care registered nurse and an activist for patients' and nurses' rights.

Her first book, Intensive Care: The Story of a Nurse, was published by Atheneum in 1987 and quickly found a place on the New York Times' bestseller list.

Bibliography

Non-fiction
Intensive Care: The Story of a Nurse (1987)
Condition Critical: The Story of a Nurse Continues (1994)
Tending Lives: Nurses On the Medical Front (1998)
 Emergency 24/7: Nurses of the Emergency Room (2015)
 Mooshie: Life With an Unconventional Cat (memoir) (2021)

Fiction
Mercy (1992)

Historical fiction
Noon at Tiffany's: An Historical, Biographical Novel (2012)

Mysteries
Pulse (1998)
Panic (1998)
Paradox (1998)
Fatal Diagnosis (2000)

References

External links
Official site

Living people
American nurses
American women nurses
American medical writers
Women medical writers
Medical fiction writers
People from Schenectady County, New York
Year of birth missing (living people)
American historical novelists
21st-century American women